Queen Quedith Claye née Harrison (born September 10, 1988) is an American hurdler and sprinter who competed in the 400 metres hurdles at the 2008 Summer Olympics.  She was a six-time collegiate All-American at Virginia Tech where she was elected to its sports hall of fame. Queen is a meet director for Virginia's Best Track and Field Classic - VHSL meet hosted in Richmond, Virginia started in 2017.

Born in Loch Sheldrake, New York, Harrison attended Hermitage High School in Richmond, Virginia, where she competed in events including hurdling, long jump, and triple jump.

She went on to attend Virginia Tech. She set a school record of 55.81 in the 400 meter hurdles while placing third at the 2007 NCAA Championship. Harrison made NCAA history in 2010 by becoming the first woman to ever win both the 100m and 400m hurdles titles at the NCAA Outdoor Championships. She also won the 60m hurdle title at the 2009 NCAA Indoor Championships making her a 3-time national champ while at Virginia Tech. Queen Harrison set an ACC record in the 400 meter hurdles.

Harrison placed second at the 400 meter hurdles at 2008 U.S. Olympic Trials with a time of 54.60. Harrison became the first track and field athlete from Virginia Tech to compete at the Olympics.

At the 2008 Summer Olympics, Harrison was eliminated in the 400 meter hurdles semifinals after finishing with a time of 55.88 seconds.

On December 16, 2010, Queen Harrison won The Bowerman, the "Heisman of Track and Field".

She qualified to the 2011 World Championships in Athletics, but did not make it out of the semi-final round.

At the 2012 Olympic trials, she narrowly missed qualifying for the finals in the shorter 100 meters hurdles.  At 400 hurdles, was the slowest time qualifier into the semis-final round and ran even slower in that semi-final.    Since 2012, her IAAF profile shows no results in the longer race.  Instead she has focused her efforts into the shorter race.

She finished second at the 2013 USA Outdoor Track and Field Championships setting her personal best at 12.43.  That ranks her tied for the 16th best performer on the all-time list.  That qualified her to the 2013 World Championships in Athletics in the new event.  She finished fifth in the final.

She placed fourth at the 2015 National Championships from which she was selected to compete at the 2015 Pan American Games where she won the gold medal.

Queen placed fourth in the 100 meter hurdles in 12.57 at the 2016 United States Olympic Trials (track and field) on July 8.

Queen married fellow US athlete Will Claye in October 2018.   Claye proposed immediately after winning the silver medal in the triple jump at the 2016 Olympic Games in Rio.

References

External links 
 
 NBC Olympics Profile
In-depth article from New York Times

QUEEN HARRISON - ASICS TRACK ATHLETE

1988 births
Living people
American female hurdlers
Athletes (track and field) at the 2008 Summer Olympics
Olympic track and field athletes of the United States
Athletes (track and field) at the 2015 Pan American Games
Pan American Games gold medalists for the United States
Pan American Games medalists in athletics (track and field)
African-American female track and field athletes
Medalists at the 2015 Pan American Games
People from Fallsburg, New York
21st-century African-American sportspeople
21st-century African-American women
20th-century African-American people
20th-century African-American women